William Joseph Dendinger (born May 20, 1939) is an American prelate of the Roman Catholic Church. Appointed by Pope John Paul II, he served as bishop of the Diocese of Grand Island in Nebraska from December 13, 2004, until January 14, 2015.

Before his appointment as bishop, Dendinger served 31 years in the United States Air Force Chaplain Corps, eventually becoming chief of the Corps.

Biography

Early years 
William Dendinger was born on May 20, 1939, in Coleridge, Nebraska, the youngest of the six children of David and Regina Dendinger. Raised on a farm, he was a member of the first graduating class of Mount Michael High School in Elkhorn, Nebraska, in 1957. Dendinger then studied at the Immaculate Conception Seminary in Conception, Missouri, where he earned a Bachelor of Arts in philosophy in 1961. Dendinger then entered the Aquinas Institute of Theology in Dubuque, Iowa, earning his Master of Theology degree in 1964.

Priesthood 
On May 29, 1965, Dendinger was ordained by Archbishop Gerald Bergan to the priesthood for the Archdiocese of Omaha. After his ordination, Dendinger taught at St. Edward Central Catholic High School in Elgin, Nebraska.  He obtained his Master of Science in counseling degree from Creighton University in 1969.

US Air Force chaplain 
In 1970, Dendinger was commissioned into the United States Air Force Chaplain Corps.  After four men from Elgin died during the Vietnam War, he had decided to become a military chaplain. During his time in the Chaplain Corps, Dendinger was assigned as base chaplain at Maxwell Air Force Base in Montgomery, Alabama, Yokota Air Base in Tokyo, Japan, Osan Air Base in Pyeongtaek, South Korea, Mather Air Force Base in Sacramento, California and Hahn Air Base in what was then West Germany.

In 1974, Dendinger was appointed cadet wing chaplain at the U.S. Air Force Academy, serving there for four years.  He also served on the chaplain resource board for the U.S. Air Force Chaplain Service Institute at Maxwell AFB from 1982 to 1985. In 1995, Dendinger was appointed deputy chief of the Chaplain Corps, stationed in Washington, D.C. In 1997, he became as chief of the Chaplain Corps in Washington. Dendinger retired from the Air Force in 2001 as a two-star general.  His first civilian posting was as pastor of St. Stephen the Martyr Parish in Omaha.

Bishop of Grand Island 

On October 14, 2004, Pope John Paul II appointed Dendinger as bishop of the Diocese of Grand Island. He was consecrated at St. Mary's Cathedral in Grand Island, Nebraska, on December 13, 2004, by Archbishop Elden Curtiss. Bishops Fabian Bruskewitz and Lawrence McNamara served as co-consecrators.

Retirement 
On January 14, 2015, Pope Francis accepted Dendinger's letter of resignation as bishop of Grand Island and appointed Monsignor Joseph G. Hanefeldt as his replacement. After retirement, Dendinger celebrated masses in diocese churches for priests on vacation.

Awards and military decorations

See also
 

 Catholic Church hierarchy
 Catholic Church in the United States
 Historical list of the Catholic bishops of the United States
 List of Catholic bishops of the United States
 Lists of patriarchs, archbishops, and bishops

References

External links

Roman Catholic Diocese of Grand Island
Bio at Diocese of Grand Island

Episcopal succession

1939 births
Living people
People from Cedar County, Nebraska
Catholics from Nebraska
Roman Catholic Archdiocese of Omaha
Roman Catholic bishops of Grand Island
21st-century Roman Catholic bishops in the United States
Aquinas Institute of Theology alumni
Creighton University alumni
United States Air Force generals
Chiefs of Chaplains of the United States Air Force
Deputy Chiefs of Chaplains of the United States Air Force